Bruno Foucher (born 3 October 1960) is a French diplomat. He has been ambassador of France to Lebanon since 2017 until 2020.

References

1960 births
Living people
21st-century French diplomats